Anatoli Anatolyevich Sylka (born 18 May 1978; died 26 April 2009) was a Russian professional football player.

Club career
He made his Russian Football National League debut for FC Lada Tolyatti on 1 April 2001 in a game against FC Baltika Kaliningrad.

References

External links
 

1978 births
People from Stavropol Krai
2009 deaths
Russian footballers
FC Lada-Tolyatti players
FC Akhmat Grozny players
Association football defenders
Sportspeople from Stavropol Krai
FC Mashuk-KMV Pyatigorsk players